Joseph Downing Wood (February 22, 1867 – April 16, 1959) was an American businessman and politician who served on the Norfolk, Virginia city council. First elected to the council in 1926, he was president of the council and mayor of the city from 1940 until his resignation in 1944.

He was married to Ada Estelle Burnell on June 2, 1896.

References

External links

1867 births
1959 deaths
Mayors of Norfolk, Virginia
20th-century American politicians